Alejandro Quiroz (9 August 1920 – 10 January 2022) was a Mexican modern pentathlete. He competed at the 1948 Summer Olympics.

References

External links
 

1920 births
2022 deaths
Mexican male modern pentathletes
Olympic modern pentathletes of Mexico
Modern pentathletes at the 1948 Summer Olympics
Mexican centenarians
Men centenarians
Sportspeople from Mexico City
20th-century Mexican people